J. Michael MacDonald was the 22nd Chief Justice of Nova Scotia. He replaced Constance Glube on December 31, 2004, serving until his retirement in 2019.

Early life and education
Raised in the Whitney Pier neighbourhood of Sydney, Nova Scotia, MacDonald received a Bachelor of Arts from Mount Allison University and then graduated from Dalhousie Law School in 1978.

Legal career
MacDonald then worked as a lawyer in the Sydney, Nova Scotia office of the law firm of Stewart McKelvey Stirling Scales, becoming a partner.

In 1995, MacDonald was appointed to the Supreme Court of Nova Scotia, and was elevated to Associate Chief Justice in 1998.  He became the 22nd Chief Justice of Nova Scotia and the Chief Justice of the Nova Scotia Court of Appeal in 2004.

The Honourable J. Michael MacDonald retired as Chief Justice of Nova Scotia, effective January 31, 2019, marking the end of a 40-year legal career, much of which he spent presiding over court cases, championing better access to justice, and creating opportunities for his fellow judges to engage and learn from racialized communities.

On July 23, 2020 it was announced by Nova Scotia Justice Minister Mark Furey and federal Minister of Public Safety and Emergency Preparedness Bill Blair that J. Michael MacDonald would serve on a 3-person Independent Review Panel concerning the RCMP response to the mass shooting that occurred in Nova Scotia on April 18/19, 2020. Families of the 22 victims killed during the shooting reacted to the announcement with disappointment, as they had been calling for a full public inquiry.

References

Living people
Schulich School of Law alumni
Lawyers in Nova Scotia
Judges in Nova Scotia
Year of birth missing (living people)